Steel Seal is an Italian Neoclassical Power Metal band formed in 2003 by guitar player and main songwriter, Marco Valerio Zangani (Sacer Tiber), and vocalist Bruno Baudo, bassist Roberto Fasciani and the keyboardist Adriano Rossi. They produced their first demo in 2003, entitled Demo 2003, with computer-generated drums, which led to a recording contract with Italian label Underground Symphony in 2004. Internal band problems resulted in the departure of Baudo and Fasciani, and the arrival of Andrea Orciuolo, Fabio Bernardi, Luca Iovieno. With a hole in the vocalist spot, the band recruited world-renowned singer D.C. Cooper (Royal Hunt, Silent Force) as a session vocalist and By the Power of Thunder was released in Japan in December 2006 and worldwide in 2007. In 2008, original members Fasciani and Rossi replaced Orciuolo and Bernardi and this time around, Thomas Vikstrom (Candlemass, Brazen Abbot, Stormwind, Therion, etc.) handled vocal duties for the follow-up album, recording them in Argentina in January 2009. On one song, Vikstrom sings a duet with Italian vocalist Val Shieldon (Sigma, Oracle Sun), who also is credited for the backing vocals on many tracks. Redemption Denied was released worldwide by Underground Symphony in 2010. With the same line-up, and the Italian vocalist Fabio Lione (Labyrinth, Rhapsody of Fire, Vision Divine, Angra) as a special guest, the band started to work on the following album. After a long and troubled preparation, The Lion's Den was released worldwide, in 2017: besides Lione, other guests are guitarist Lorenzo Milone, as for the previous album, and Andrea De Paoli (Shadows of Steel, Labyrinth, Vision Divine) on the keyboards. The album enhanced the Neoclassical influences of the band (Beethoven, Verdi, Bach, Paganini) reproposing at the same time their typical mixture of Power Metal and Hard Rock with lyrics often deriving from verses of famous British and American poets. Subsequently, the same musicians, including Lione as a session vocalist again, recorded the still unreleased Fireraiser, completed in 2020 at the Outer Sound Studios in Rome, like its three predecessors. On one song, Lione sings a duet with Italian vocalist Andrea Marchisio (Desdemona, Highlord); other guests are Milone, as usual, and Val Shieldon again, who sings a cover of Lost and Lonely Days by Warlord. The release of the album is about to be scheduled by Underground Symphony.

Line-up

 Marco Valerio Zangani - Guitar
 Roberto Fasciani - Bass
 Adriano Rossi - Keyboards
 Luca Iovieno - Drums
 Fabio Lione - vocals (Guest)

Former members
 Bruno Baudo - Vocals
 D.C. Cooper (Session) – Vocals
 Andrea Orciuolo - Bass
 Fabio Bernardi - Keyboards
 Thomas Vikstrom (Session) - Vocals

Discography

Albums
 Demo 2003 (2003)
 By the Power of Thunder (2007)
 Redemption Denied (2010)
 The Lion's Den  (2017)
 Fireraiser (forthcoming)

External links
 Steel Seal’s official website

Italian power metal musical groups
Musical groups established in 2003